The Maurice Farman MF.16 was a French reconnaissance aircraft developed before World War I by the Farman Aviation Works.

Design and development
The MF.16 was a pusher biplane like previous Farman aircraft, and had a sesquiplane layout.

Specifications

See also

References

Further reading
 

 

1910s French military reconnaissance aircraft
Single-engined pusher aircraft
Biplanes
MF.16
Aircraft first flown in 1913